Pedro António Avondano (16 April 1714 - 1782) was a Portuguese composer of Italian parentage.

Pedro António was born and died in Lisbon.  His father Pietro Giorgio Avondano of Genoa, was a violinist at the court of João V, one of many Italian musicians at the Portuguese court.

Pedro António Avondano is mainly noted, like Domenico Scarlatti, for harpsichord sonatas and sacred music.

Works, editions and recordings
 comic opera Il mondo della luna, with libretto by Carlo Goldoni
 oratorio Il voto di Jefte
 oratorio Adamo ed Eva
 sacred works, inc. Tantum ergo
 sinfonie
Editions
 Forty-nine Lisbon minuets by Pedro Antonio Avondano  ed. Mary Farrar Hatchette, Tulane University of Louisiana, 1971 - 334 pages.
Recordings
 Avondano. Sonata in C major. Sousa Carvalho. Toccata in G minor, Allegro in D major. Ruggero Gerlin (harpsichord). Philips © 835769I.Y LP, 1967
 Harpsichord works. Rosana Lanzelotte. Portugaler, 2006.
Il mondo della luna, Naxos, 2020
Some of Avondano's works were revived at the Festival d'Ambronay in 2006.

References

External links
 
 Biography (in Portuguese)

1714 births
1782 deaths
Composers for harpsichord
Portuguese violinists
Male violinists
Portuguese composers
Portuguese male composers
People from Lisbon
18th-century Portuguese musicians
Portuguese people of Italian descent
18th-century composers
18th-century male musicians
18th-century musicians